Birch Evans Bayh III (born December 26, 1955) is an American lawyer, lobbyist, and Democratic Party politician who served as a United States senator from Indiana from 1999 to 2011 and the 46th governor of Indiana from 1989 to 1997.

Bayh was first elected to public office as the Secretary of State of Indiana in 1986. He held the position for two years before being elected Governor. He left his office after completing two terms and briefly took a job lecturing at Indiana University Bloomington. He was elected to Congress as a Senator in 1998 and reelected in 2004.

On February 15, 2010, Bayh unexpectedly announced he would not seek reelection to the Senate in 2010. After leaving the Senate, he was replaced by his predecessor, Dan Coats, and became a partner with the law and lobbying firm McGuireWoods in the firm's Washington, D.C. office, and also became a senior adviser with Apollo Global Management. He was a part-time contributor for Fox News from March 2011 to July 2016. In June 2011 he became a messaging adviser for the U.S. Chamber of Commerce. On October 27, 2011, it was announced that Berry Plastics Corp. had appointed Bayh to its board of directors.

Following the withdrawal of 2016 Democratic primary winner Baron Hill, Bayh announced that he would be running to take back his old Senate seat from retiring Republican incumbent Dan Coats. He was defeated by Todd Young in the  general election by a 10-point margin (52% to 42%).

Bayh is the son of Senator Birch Bayh, Jr. and the grandson of basketball coach Birch E. Bayh.

Personal life

Birch Evans Bayh III was born on December 26, 1955, in Shirkieville, Indiana, to Marvella Bayh (née Hern; 1933–1979) and Birch E. Bayh Jr. (1928–2019), who was a U.S. Senator from 1963 until 1981, following his electoral defeat by then-Representative and future Vice President Dan Quayle.

Evan Bayh attended St. Albans School in Washington, D.C., and graduated with honors with a B.S. in business administration from the Kelley School of Business at Indiana University Bloomington in 1978. At Indiana, he became a member of the Phi Kappa Psi fraternity's Indiana Beta chapter. 

Bayh received his Juris Doctor (J.D.) degree from the University of Virginia School of Law in 1981.
Bayh and his late wife, Susan, had twin sons, Birch Evans IV (Beau) and Nicholas, born in 1995. Susan Bayh served on corporate boards, including health insurance company Anthem. She was a law professor.

Susan died from glioblastoma on February 5, 2021.

Indiana state politics

After a debate over whether he met the state's five-year residency requirement to be on the ballot, Bayh defeated former Kokomo Mayor Steve Daily in the Democratic primary of the 1988 Indiana gubernatorial election. He went on to defeat the incumbent lieutenant governor (Republican John Mutz) in the general election, becoming the first Democrat to serve as Governor of Indiana in 20 years. Only 32 years old upon his election and 33 when he took office, Bayh became the youngest governor in the nation at the time. He was re-elected as governor in 1992, defeating State Attorney General Linley E. Pearson with 63% of the vote.

By the end of his second term, Bayh had an approval rating of nearly 80 percent. He was ineligible to seek a third consecutive term in 1996 due to term limits.

When his second term as governor ended in 1997, he accepted a lecturing position at his alma mater, the Kelley School of Business at Indiana University Bloomington. From 1997 to 1998, while he was campaigning for U.S. Senate, Bayh was also hired as a partner at Indianapolis law firm Baker & Daniels. In 1998, his Baker & Daniels salary was $265,000, according to Senate financial records. Indiana University paid him an additional $51,000 that year.

United States Senate

Bayh was elected to the U.S. Senate in 1998 to the seat that was once held by his father. He won with 64% of the vote, the largest margin ever recorded for a Democrat in a U.S. Senate race in Indiana, defeating former Fort Wayne Mayor Paul Helmke. 
He easily won reelection in 2004, defeating Prof. Marvin Scott, receiving 62% of the vote—in the process, becoming only the fifth Indiana Democrat to be popularly elected to a second term in the Senate.

Bayh released an autobiography in 2003 entitled From Father to Son: A Private Life in the Public Eye.

From 2001 to 2005, Bayh served as Chairman of the Democratic Leadership Council (DLC). He is also a member of the Senate Centrist Coalition, helped establish the New Democrat Coalition, and founded the Moderate Dems Working Group. Bayh also served on the board of directors of the National Endowment for Democracy.

Bayh was an early supporter of the Bush administration's policies on Iraq.  On October 2, 2002, Bayh joined President George W. Bush and Congressional leaders in a Rose Garden ceremony announcing their agreement on the joint resolution authorizing the Iraq War, and was thanked by Bush and Senator John McCain for co-sponsoring the resolution. He voted yes on reauthorizing the Patriot Act in 2006.

In the aftermath of the Financial crisis of 2007–2008, Bayh joined with his fellow senators in hurrying to bail out U.S. financial institutions. Addressing the launch of the No Labels political organization, he "described a scene from 2008 where Ben Bernanke warned senators that the sky would collapse if the banks weren't rescued. 'We looked at each other,' said Bayh, 'and said, okay, what do we need.'"

Retirement

On February 15, 2010, Bayh announced he would not seek reelection to a third Senate term in the November 2, 2010, midterm election. Bayh's announcement came very shortly after former Senator Dan Coats declared his own candidacy for Bayh's Senate seat. Because he made his announcement the day before the deadline for filing for the primary, no Democrat was able to gather a sufficient number of signatures to qualify for the primary ballot, so the state party committee chose Congressman Brad Ellsworth as the nominee.

According to the Associated Press, Bayh spent a significant portion of his last year in office searching for a job, holding over four dozen meetings with potential corporate employers between February and December 2010. He also cast votes on issues of interest to his future corporate employers. A CNN analysis of Bayh's internal 2009 schedule found that he "maneuvered behind the scenes" and "privately engaged with fundraisers, lobbyists and donors who had a keen interest on the issues dominating Capitol Hill," raising potential conflict-of-interest concerns. His meetings included sessions with lobbyists for the health insurance industry prior to his announcement that he would support the Affordable Care Act.

Committee assignments
Committee on Armed Services
Subcommittee on Airland
Subcommittee on Emerging Threats and Capabilities
Subcommittee on Readiness and Management Support (Chairman)
Committee on Banking, Housing, and Urban Affairs
Subcommittee on Financial Institutions
Subcommittee on Securities, Insurance, and Investment
Subcommittee on Security and International Trade and Finance (Chairman)
Committee on Energy and Natural Resources
Subcommittee on Energy
Subcommittee on National Parks
Subcommittee on Water and Power
Committee on Small Business and Entrepreneurship
Select Committee on Intelligence
Special Committee on Aging

Relationship between office and late wife's corporate career
Susan Bayh, Evan Bayh's late wife, has been described by the Fort Wayne Journal Gazette as a "professional board member" or "professional director", having been a director of fourteen corporations since 1994 and being a director of eight as of 2006.

The Journal Gazette reported that since Susan Bayh began her career as a corporate director, "Sen. Evan Bayh [has] cast more than 3,000 votes, including some on issues of keen interest to the pharmaceutical, broadcast, insurance, food-distribution and finance industries".

Since 2003, Bayh prohibited his staff from having lobbying contacts with his late wife or representatives of the companies she directs. Bayh has insisted his late wife's ties have had no bearing on his congressional actions. "The reality is I don't even know the people who run the vast majority of her companies. I've never even spoken to them," Bayh told the Journal Gazette. "The reality is, we don't talk about stuff that she's involved with."

2008 U.S. presidential election

On December 1, 2006, news sources revealed that Bayh was creating a presidential exploratory committee. Bayh confirmed these reports on December 3. On December 15, 2006, Bayh announced that he would not run for president in 2008. He later endorsed Hillary Clinton.

During the 2008 United States Presidential campaign, Bayh stated that he would accept an offer to be Barack Obama's running mate. According to David Plouffe, it was a "coin toss" between Bayh and Joe Biden for Obama's pick for vice president, with Tim Kaine being a contender before deciding to focus on the DNC chairmanship. However in his 2020 memoir A Promised Land Barack Obama does not mention that Bayh was considered a possible running mate, and indicated that when making the final decision as to who would be the second name on the ticket it was a straight choice between Biden and Kaine.

Post-Senate career

After his retirement from the U.S. Senate, Bayh campaigned for Senator Joe Donnelly's two-day, five-city "main street tour," among other visits, and introduced Donnelly before his victory speech in Indiana's 2012 U.S. Senate election.

As of the end of 2015, Bayh had just over $9 million in unspent campaign cash.

Bayh's net worth soared to between $13.9 million and $48 million after he left office and began a post-Congress career with lobbying firms and corporate boards. This was a significant increase over the $6.8-$8.0 million in assets he reported during his last year in Congress. Bayh received over $6 million in compensation from salary, compensation from corporate boards, and speaking fees from January 2015 through October 2016.

2016 U.S. Senate campaign

On July 11, 2016, CNN reported that Bayh was preparing to enter the 2016 U.S. Senate election in Indiana to run for the seat being vacated by Dan Coats, who was retiring. Baron Hill, who won an uncontested primary to become the Democratic nominee on May 3, formally withdrew from the race on the same day to make way for Bayh's candidacy.

Bayh ran into criticism in August 2016 over his residency status in Indiana. WFLI-TV reported that he was listed twice as an "inactive voter" in Indiana records. CNN reported that Bayh repeatedly listed his two multimillion-dollar houses in Washington, D.C., as his primary residences, not his $53,000 condo in Indianapolis. When asked by a local television reporter to state his Indiana address, he stated the wrong address. In response, Bayh stated that he "voted in every primary and every general election for the last 25 to 30 years" and is "an active voter in Indiana," and when asked how often he is in Indiana, he stated, "all the time, frequently."

Bayh was defeated by Republican Representative Todd Young 52%-42% in the November election.  This was Bayh's first ever defeat in his home state, where he was once considered "unbeatable".

Political positions

Abortion
Evan Bayh has a 100% rating by NARAL. He voted in favor of the Partial-Birth Abortion Ban Act in 2003. He voted against the Unborn Victims of Violence Act in 2004. He voted in favor of the Child Interstate Abortion Notification Act in 2006. He voted against an amendment to prohibit federal funds from going to groups that support coerced abortion. He repeatedly voted against amendments to prohibit federal funds from being used for abortions.

Agriculture
Bayh voted for the 2002 Farm Bill that provided financial support accessible to rural communities. The bill provides funds for rural water and waste infrastructure. The Farm Bill also provides technology for rural residents' technical skills.

Capital punishment
As Governor of Indiana, Bayh was a vocal supporter of capital punishment.

Civil rights
Bayh has a mixed but left-leaning record on civil rights, having earned a 60% by the ACLU (2002), and 89% by the HRC (2006), and a 100% by the NAACP (2006). Some of his votes include a 1998 vote where Bayh voted to continue nonquota affirmative action programs. He voted to add sexual orientation under hate crime rules in both 2000 and 2002. In 2001, he voted yes to ease wiretapping restrictions. In 2006, he voted yes on a flag-burning constitutional amendment and no on an amendment to ban same-sex marriage.

Climate change
Bayh has been called "a fence-sitter on climate legislation," because he has stated concern about the effects of climate change but he also values cheap energy as beneficial to Indiana's manufacturing industry. In 2008 he signed a letter expressing concerns with a cap-and-trade bill known as the Climate Security Act that was then on the Senate floor, but he ultimately voted for the bill. In 2010 he voted to prevent the EPA from regulating greenhouse gas pollution.

Economy
At a speech to the Commonwealth Club of California, Bayh said:
What concerns me most about President Bush's tax and budget proposals, is that they threaten to undermine the foundation of the '90s' prosperityreplacing the "virtuous cycle" created by fiscal responsibility with a "vicious cycle" of deficits and debt, rising interest rates, and disinvestment. His proposals constitute a narrow ideological agenda, not an effective economic strategy, and completely fail to grasp the realities of the New Economy and the many requirements for economic success in the 21st Century.

Education
As governor, Bayh created the 21st Century Scholars program, which promises at-risk middle school students full tuition scholarships in return for being drug, alcohol and crime-free and maintaining decent grades. Iowa and Wisconsin have both introduced legislation modeling Bayh's program.

Environment
Voted no on prohibiting eminent domain for use as parks or grazing land in December 2007.
Voted yes on including oil and gas smokestacks in mercury regulations in September 2005.
Rated 74% by the League of Conservation Voters, indicating pro-environment votes, in December 2003.
Voted no on confirming Gale Norton as Secretary of Interior in January 2001.
Voted no on more funding for forest roads and fish habitat in September 1999.
Voted to strengthen prohibitions against animal fighting in January 2007.

Health care
Bayh introduced the Medicare Prescription Drug Emergency Guarantee Act of 2006 to amend titles XVIII and XIX of the Social Security Act to assure uninterrupted access to necessary medicines under the Medicare prescription drug program. Bayh proposed legislation he says could help cut health care insurance premiums by at least 20 percent for small businesses and individuals. He voted in favor of the Patient Protection and Affordable Care Act and the Health Care and Education Reconciliation Act (both 2010).

Israel
He is a member of AIPAC's advisory committee.

Iran
Bayh appeared on CNN's Late Edition in January 2006 and referred to the "radical, almost delusional nature of the Iranian regime" and recent comments of Iranian President Mahmoud Ahmadinejad that the Holocaust is a "myth. To deny history like this, this virulent anti-Semitism, their sponsoring of terrorism, their search for a nuclear weaponought to be a wake-up call to every American. Appeasement won't work. We need to use diplomacy, economic sanctions, other means, so we won't have to resort to military action."

Bayh introduced legislation in January 2006 that would impose sanctions on Iran.

On January 20, 2006, Bayh introduced a resolution calling for economic sanctions on Iran, with the goal of deterring Iran from developing nuclear weapons. In 2007, Bayh "supported the Kyl-Lieberman amendment that Obama made a key part of his critique of Clinton."

Iraq

Bayh was an early supporter of the idea of removing Saddam Hussein from power for humanitarian reasons.

On October 2, 2002, Bayh joined President George W. Bush and congressional leaders in a Rose Garden ceremony announcing their agreement on the joint resolution authorizing the Iraq War, and was thanked by Bush and Senator John McCain for co-sponsoring the resolution. In 2006, Bayh criticized the conduct of the Iraq War:
It is clear to just about everyone but the die-hard neoconservatives within this administration that shifting our focus away from Osama bin Laden to Saddam Hussein was perhaps the biggest strategic blunder in our nation's history. And while we have been preoccupied with Iraq, under this President, North Korea has gone nuclear and Iran is on the verge of doing so.

A blog from The Washington Post reported that in February 2006 Bayh was quoted saying: "We've got to be somewhere between 'cut and run' ... and mindlessly staying the course. You've got to have a sensible middle ground."

Trade
During his time in the Senate, Bayh criticized trade policies of some countries, including China. Bayh's bipartisan Stopping Overseas Subsidies (SOS) Act was intended to allow the United States to enforce its antisubsidy laws abroad. He voted against CAFTA.

Bayh placed a hold on the President's nominee to be the U.S. Trade Representative. After receiving several key commitments from nominee (now U.S. Senator) Rob Portman to get tough on China trade, Bayh agreed to release his hold.

Electoral history

See also

Birch Evans Bayh Sr.
List of governors of Indiana

References

External links

Evan Bayh for Senate 2016 Campaign
Evan Bayh column archives at The Huffington Post

DePauw University 2006 commencement speech
University of Virginia Commencement Speech

|-

|-

|-

|-

|-

|-

|-

|-

|-

 
1955 births
Living people
20th-century American Episcopalians
20th-century American politicians
21st-century American Episcopalians
21st-century American politicians
American Christian Zionists
American lobbyists
American people of German descent
American people of English descent
American people of Scotch-Irish descent
American people of Scottish descent
Bayh family
Democratic Party governors of Indiana
Democratic Party United States senators from Indiana
Fox News people
Indiana lawyers
Indiana University faculty
Kelley School of Business alumni
People from Vigo County, Indiana
Politicians from Indianapolis
Secretaries of State of Indiana
St. Albans School (Washington, D.C.) alumni
University of Virginia School of Law alumni
The Washington Institute for Near East Policy
Candidates in the 2016 United States Senate elections